The following lists events that happened during 1910 in the Russian Empire.

Incumbents
 Monarch – Nicholas II
 Chairman of the Council of Ministers – Pyotr Arkadyevich Stolypin

Events
 17 June - Khodynka Aerodrome founded
 15 October - Manchurian plague outbreak in the Russian Far East
 21 November - Sevastopol Aviation Officers School founded

Births
 21 June - Alexander Tvardovsky, writer
 23 July - Pimen (Izvekov), 14th Patriarch of Moscow and all Rus' (1971–1990)
 5 December - Mikhail Semichastny, football player

Deaths
 14 April - Mikhail Vrubel, painter
 29 May - Mily Balakirev, composer
 24 July - Arkhip Kuindzhi, painter
 20 November - Lev Tolstoy, writer and philosopher (b. 1828)
 Maria Golitzyna, noble, courtier and philanthropist (b. 1834)

References

 
1910s in the Russian Empire
Years of the 20th century in the Russian Empire
Russia
Russia